Wanniarachchige Damayanthi Priyalatha Fonseka (born 25 August 1960 as දමයන්ති ෆොන්සේකා) [Sinhala]), popularly as Damayanthi Fonseka, is an actress in Sri Lankan cinema, theater and television as well as a director and producer.

Personal life
She was born on 25 August 1960 in Kelaniya in a family with 11 siblings. Her father Gilbert Fonseka worked at a Government Press. Her mother Seelwathie Fonseka from Peliyagoda, Kelaniya and was a housewife.

She got a government teaching appointment to Habarana. But she refused to move far from home. She married popular filmmaker Prasanna Vithanage. She got two natural abortions and hence no any children.

Family background
Three of her sisters - Malini, Sriyani, Rasadari and two brothers - Dayananda and Ananda are entered to cinema. Her elder sister Malini Fonseka is considered as the Queen of Sinhala cinema, where she has acted many critically acclaimed films since 1963. Malini is also a recipient of Best Actress award in all local award festivals. Malini is married to fellow popular actor Lucky Dias and divorced in 2011. Damayanthi is also the aunt of popular actresses Samanalee Fonseka and Senali Fonseka as well as sister-in-law of Karunarathna Hangawaththa. Her nephew Ashan is also an actor. Her grand daughter Kushenya Sayumi entered cinema with the film Rookada Panchi. She is the daughter of Samanalee's brother Asanga Fonseka and Imalka Samaraweera.

Sister Sriyani has acted in popular films such as Lokuma Hinawa, Hondai Narakai, Thilaka Saha Thilakaa, Niwena Ginna and Selinage Walawwa. Rasadari Fonseka has acted in films such as Situ Kumariyo and Athin Athata. Rasadari is married to fellow actor Karunarathna Hangawaththa. Damayanthi's elder brother Dayananda died in 2012.

Ananda Fonseka started acting with Thilaka Saha Thilakaa and continued to act in some films such as Eya Dan Loku Lamayek, Wasanthaye Dawasak, Anupama, Bamba Ketu Hati and Sasara Chethana. He also directed the film Umayangana. His daughter Samanalee is a popular film and television actress. She acted in critically acclaimed films such as Motor Bicycle, Davena Wihagun and Premaya Nam. Her brother Upali Fonseka's daughter Senali Fonseka started career with blockbuster hit Siri Parakum and then took part in the film Vijayaba Kollaya as well as popular television serials Haara Kotiya and Nadagamkarayo. Apart from Samanalee and Senali, five other daughters also entered drama - Shivanya, Ruwani, Tharindi, Manori and Sanduni.

Career
She started acting at the age of 10 while attending school as a child artist. She acted in the short film Piyek Saha Minisek by I.M. Hewawasam. Her maiden cinematic appearance came through 1976 film Madol Duwa directed by Lester James Peries under the influence by elder sister Malini. However her first screened film was Edath Suraya Adath Suraya in 1972. Since then she acted in many supportive roles in commercially successful films such as Umayangana, Dolosmahe Pahana, Angulimala, Shakthiya Obai Amme and Prathiroo.

She has produced two films, Purahanda Kaluwara and Anantha Rathriya which were directed by her husband, Prasanna Vithanage. Then she produced the film Guru Geetha directed by Upali Gamlath. She also helped support the production side of Vithange's newest film Ae. In 2013, Damayanthi established a drama school.

She has acted in many stage plays and television serials. She played a villain role in the television serial Hopalu Arana and won the award. She won a Jury award for the acting in stage play Avi and then received a Special Merit award for the film Umayangana in 1993 Sarasaviya Film Festival.

Her maiden theater production came through Ape Aeththo. In 2017, she directed the tele serial Rankiri Amma where her sister Malini acted in main role. She also directed the teledrama Iragala Nekatha. Before that, she produced two stage plays Gasthuwa Keeyada and Parana Pinak. In 2003, she produced the play Popiyana Uyana and introduced her nephew Ashan Fonseka into stage.

In 2014, she directed the stage play Gasthuwa Keeyada a Sinhala adaptation of the play "Farewell" by Alexander Vampilov in 1966. The premier show was held at the Namel Malini Punchi Theatre, Colombo 8 on October 5, 2014 at 3.30 p.m and 6.45 p.m. The repeat of the show was held at the S.D.S. Jayasinghe Hall, Dehiwala on October 12, 2014 at 3.30 p.m and 6.45 p.m. In 2015, she produced the play Parana Pinak which premiered at the Namel Malini Punchi Theater on June 6 at 3.30 pm and 6.30 pm.

Selected stage plays

 Amal Biso
 Api Kawuda
 Avi
 Awalan Kalla
 Balawa Namaka Aruma
 Bheema Bhomi
 Boniki Gedara 
 Debiddo
 Deshapaluwa
 Devlowa Yanakan
 Dukganna Rala
 Dvitva
 Erabadu Mal Pottu Pipila
 Ex Girlfriend
 Kadadasi Oru
 Little Animal's Home
 Loka Dekai Eka Minihai
 Man Nilame
 Nari Bena
 Paarajika
 Rajakiya Wendesiya
 Sivamma Dhanapala
 Ukdandu Hewana
 Viyanga
 Wes

Selected television serials

 Andiri Hewanella
 Amanda
 Ambu Daruwo
 Divya
 Garunda Damana 
 Hopalu Arana
 Kumarihami
 Mudiyanse Mama
 Nenala <ref>{{cite web |url=http://www.sarasaviya.lk/teledramas/2020/09/24/19033/නාලන්ගේ-නෑනලා-රූපවාහිනියට-එති |title=Nalan's 'Nenala come on TV |publisher=Sarasaviya |access-date=24 September 2017}}</ref>
 Pabalu Menika Prarthana Mal Piya Saha Daruwo Sudu Nelum Vila Pujasanaya Ranmasu Uyana Sanda Madala Kaluwarai Sath Mahala Senehasata Adarei Sihina Genena Kumariye Sinahawata Paata Denna Sisila Ima Sohoyuro Thurya Tikiri Nilame Tikiri Saha Ungi Udumbara Kumariyak Uragala Wana Sarana Yaddehi Gedara''

Filmography

References

External links
 MR trying to replace Muslim leadership with Salman Khan
 තරු ජෝඩු
 ගෝලයෝ- දමයන්ති ෆොන්සේකාට "පරණ පිනක්" පාදයි
 ඉතාලි නාට්‍යකරු දාරියෝ ෆෝ මියයයි
 මෛත්‍රී ගත් තීරණයෙන් පුරවැසියන්ගේ පිබිදීමක් ඇතිවෙලා
 කවුද අනේ එයා.. ‘ හෙළවුඩයේ fun කතාවක්
 ජලා හුටා වලව්වේ මැණිකෙත් වැවේ
 බජට් හදන්න මරු
 කලාකාරියක්වීම පිනක් ආදරය දිනාගැනීමත් පිනක්
 දමයන්තිගේ උපන් දිනයේ නිළි රැජන හා පිරිවර

Living people
Sri Lankan film actresses
1960 births